Christine Erkelens (born 27 October 1991) is a Dutch cricketer. She played in five matches for the Netherlands women's national cricket team in the 2015 ICC Women's World Twenty20 Qualifier in November and December 2015. In the match against China, Erkelens was reported for a suspect bowling action.

References

External links
 

1991 births
Living people
Dutch women cricketers
Sportspeople from Leiden